The 1985 GP Ouest-France was the 49th edition of the GP Ouest-France cycle race and was held on 27 August 1985. The race started and finished in Plouay. The race was won by Éric Guyot of the Skil team.

General classification

References

1985
1985 in road cycling
1985 in French sport
August 1985 sports events in Europe